Aghaboe can refer to
Aghaboe, a hamlet in County Laois
Abbey of Aghaboe, a ruin in the above hamlet
Aghaboe (defunct Church of Ireland parish), County Laois
Aghaboe (civil parish), a civil parish which was derived from the above, defunct, Church of Ireland parish
St. Canice, Aghaboe, the parish church of the above defunct Church of Ireland parish, which still exists in the above hamlet
Aghaboe (townland), a townland in the above civil parish
Aghaboe (Catholic parish),  which is much larger than the above civil parish and which, like it, has its origins in the ministry associated with the Abbey of Aghaboe